The Least Worst of the Suicide Machines is a compilation album by the Detroit, Michigan punk rock band The Suicide Machines, released in 2002 by Hollywood Records. It has tracks from all of the band's albums on the Hollywood label: Destruction by Definition (1996), Battle Hymns (1998), The Suicide Machines (2000), and Steal This Record (2001). It also includes several previously unreleased bonus tracks. The album was released shortly after the band had left the Hollywood label and signed with Side One Dummy Records.

Track listing

Performers
Jason Navarro - vocals
Dan Lukacinsky - guitar, backing vocals
Royce Nunley - bass, backing vocals
Derek Grant - drums, hammond organ, clavinet, piano, backing vocals (tracks 1-14, 27 & 28)
Ryan Vandeberghe - drums (tracks 15-26, 29 & 30)
Vinnie Nobile - trombone (tracks 1-8)
Larry Klimas - tenor saxophone (tracks 1-8)
Joe Bishara - loops and programming (tracks 15-20)
Bennett Salvay - orchestral arrangements and organ (tracks 15-20

Album information
Record label: Hollywood Records
All songs written by The Suicide Machines
Tracks 1-8 produced by Julian Raymond, Phil Kaffel, and The Suicide Machines. Tracks 9-14, 27 & 28 Produced by Julian Raymond and The Suicide Machines. Tracks 15-20, 29 & 30 produced by Julian Raymond.
Tracks 1-8 recorded November–December 1995 at A&M Studios in Hollywood, California by Phil Kaffel with assistance by Alex Reed and Krish Sharma. Tracks 9-20 recorded at A&M Studios in Hollywood. Tracks 21-26 recorded at Hensen Recording Studio in Hollywood. Tracks 27 & 28 recorded live December 27, 1997 at St. Andrew's Hall in Detroit, Michigan by Joe Barresi. Track 29 recorded in 1999. Track 30 recorded in 2001.
Tracks 1-8 mixed January 1996 at Conway Studios by Jerry Finn with assistance by Shawn O'Dwyer. Tracks 9-26, 29 & 30 mixed at Image Recording, Inc. by Chris Lord-Alge, with assistance by Mike Dy on tracks 9-14. Tracks 27 & 28 mixed by Joe Barresi at Pacifique Studios in North Hollywood, California with assistance by Brian Young.
Mastered by Tim Pak
Art direction and design by Mark A. Penxa

Song information
Tracks 1-8 are from the album Destruction by Definition (1996)
Tracks 9-14 are from the album Battle Hymns (1998)
Tracks 15-20 are from the album The Suicide Machines (2000)
Tracks 21-26 are from the album Steal This Record (2001)
Track 27 originally appeared on the promotional EP Live! Live! Live! (1998). Track 28 is from the same performance but was not included on the EP. Both songs were recorded live at St. Andrew's Hall in Detroit, Michigan on December 27 & 28, 1997.
Track 29 was recorded in 1999 and originally appeared on the compilation Plea for Peace: Take Action.
Track 30 was a track from the Steal This Record sessions that ultimately got cut from the final album. This is the first time it was widely released as previously it was only on the Japanese version of the album.

References

The Suicide Machines albums
2002 compilation albums
Hollywood Records compilation albums
Albums produced by Julian Raymond